A Bergmagazin is a building that served as a granary for miners and the population of mining towns in German-speaking Europe.

History (Saxony) 
The construction of Bergmagazins in the Electorate and Kingdom of Saxony grew rapidly from 1806 at the suggestion of senior mining official (Oberberghauptmann), Friedrich Wilhelm Heinrich von Trebra. As a result of the great famines in the upper Ore Mountains at the end of the 18th century caused by several poor harvests, Trebra recommended the construction of multi-storey, stone Bermagazin buildings where grain could be deposited after harvesting and stored for several months or even years.

Locations (a selection) 
 Marienberg: built 1806-1809, from 1858 it had many other uses e.g. as a military storage facility, chocolate factory, glider school, war refugee accommodation and fruit store. Following its conversion and redesign it has been used as a museum since 2006.
 Annaberg
 Schneeberg
 Freiberg: 1784-1805 converted from Freudenstein Castle into the Bergmagazin. Used as a granary until 1979
 Johanngeorgenstadt: built 1806-1812, used as a grain store until 1847. After a fire in 1899 it was converted into a residence. Demolished in 2005
 Osterode am Harz: 1719-1722 built as a corn store. Used as the town council building since 1989

Gallery

References

External links 
 History of the Bergmagazin in Marienberg

Mining culture and traditions
History of mining in Germany
Agricultural buildings in Germany